The Maysville School in Maysville, Colorado, also known as the Maysville Schoolhouse, is a schoolhouse built in 1912.  It was listed on the National Register of Historic Places in 1999.

It seems the school was built as a two-story building in 1882, located centrally in a growing town area, but by 1912, when it "acquired its current configuration", the local area was rural. It is now a one-story, vernacular wood frame one-room schoolhouse.  It served as a school until 1939, then as a private house, and in 1948 it was modified to serve as a bus garage for the school district.  It was sold to the Salida Museum Association in 1977 and then was restored.  It hosts community meetings and the teacher's quarters serve as a museum.

It has a bell tower with bell.  It is "the most intact building associated with early 20th century Maysville."

The schoolhouse is located south of U.S. Route 50.

References

External links

History museums in Colorado
One-room schoolhouses in Colorado
National Register of Historic Places in Chaffee County, Colorado
School buildings completed in 1912
School buildings on the National Register of Historic Places in Colorado
Schools in Chaffee County, Colorado